Stenocarpus cryptocarpus, commonly known as the giant-leaved stenocarpus, is a species of flowering plant in the family Proteaceae and is endemic to north Queensland. It is a tree with buttress roots at the base, simple, mostly elliptical adult leaves, groups of cream-coloured flowers and narrow oblong follicles.

Description
It is a canopy tree and has buttress roots at the base.

The leaves are glossy green and covered with woolly, rust-coloured hairs when young.

Taxonomy
Stenocarpus cryptocarpus was first formally described in 1988 by botanists Don Foreman and Bernie Hyland in the journal Muelleria from specimens collected by Hyland from North Queensland in 1969. The specific epithet (cryptocarpus) means "hidden-fruited".

Distribution and habitat

References

External links
 
 View a map of recorded sightings of Stenocarpus cryptocarpus at the Australasian Virtual Herbarium
 See images of Stenocarpus cryptocarpus on Flickriver

Flora of Queensland
cryptocarpus
Taxa named by Bernard Hyland
Taxa named by Don Foreman
Plants described in 1988